The Brain Tumor Funders' Collaborative (BTFC) is a partnership of nine private organizations designed to bridge the gap that can sometimes prevent laboratory science from yielding new medical treatments.

History
Formed over a period of two years, a group of private funders supporting brain cancer research attended a series of workshops with researchers and clinicians, and asked each other to identify new forms of research, and structures within the research community that were needed to produce effective therapies for brain tumors. The result was the outline of a new funding initiative, to attempt to provide new approaches to cancer research. Collaboration among investigators, cooperation between basic science and clinical application, and merging of disciplines and institutions that operate independently, are the foundation of the approach.

Each participating member of BTFC also maintains its own grant-making program and, in some cases, patient information and advocacy programs. These are accessible through their individual websites.

On March 14, 2006, the Brain Tumor Funders' Collaborative announced results of their first joint funding initiative: up to three $2 million multi-year grants, awarded to multi-institutional teams of researchers and clinicians dedicated to finding new treatments for brain cancer patients.

Membership
The five current members of the Brain Tumor Funders' Collaborative are:

American Brain Tumor Association
Brain Tumour Foundation of Canada
Children's Brain Tumor Foundation
James S. McDonnell Foundation
Sontag Foundation

Past members
Past member organizations are:

Goldhirsh Foundation
Ben and Catherine Ivy Foundation
National Brain Tumor Society

References

External links
 Brain Tumor Funders' Collaborative Official Website
 Press Release

Cancer organizations based in the United States